Das Erbe ("The Inheritance") was a Nazi propaganda movie published in 1935. Produced by Harold Mayer under the aegis of the Nazi party's Office of Racial Policy and directed by Carl C. Hartmann, it aimed at legitimizing the Law for the Prevention of Hereditarily Diseased Offspring ("Gesetz zur Verhütung erbkranken Nachwuchses"), which allowed for sterilization. The movie is 12 minutes long, and was shown as part of several trailers in contemporary German movie theaters.

Plot and message

The plot was written by Walter Lüddeke. The basic message, that only the strong and healthy are victorious, is demonstrated by fighting stag beetles commented on by a "professor", e.g. stag beetles in the intro. These clips are watched by the character Fräulein Volkmann, a blonde young woman, who is therewith introduced to the "struggle for existence". After watching the clips, Volkmann is astonished and says to the friendly, elderly professor: "So animals actually pursue a racial policy!" In the second part, the movie discusses the sorrow of the disabled and posits a relation between choice of the right partner and hereditary diseases of the offspring. The message is carried by shock clips of asylum patients and presentation of the high care cost.

Peter Zimmermann of the House of Documentary Film in Stuttgart evaluates the movie as follows:The short movie Das Erbe (1935), which leads over from the animals' struggle for survival and natural selection to a plea for forced sterilization of the mentally ill, marks exactly the point where Social Darwinist biologism turns into Fascist racial policy providing the reasoning for the necessity of euthanasia.

In addition to Das Erbe, two silent movies were produced in 1935 to propagate euthanasia in the German population, Sünden der Väter and Abseits vom Wege ("Sins of the Fathers" and "Off track"). In the subsequent years, the media campaign was completed by another sound movie, "Opfer der Vergangenheit" ("Sacrifice of the Past", 1937) and three more silent movies, "Erbkrank" ("Inherited Malady", 1936), "Alles Leben ist Kampf" ("All Life is Struggle", 1937) and "Was du ererbst" ("What You Inherit", 1939). All these movies were produced by the Office of Racial Policy, shot in the Berlin area, and shown nationwide in movie theaters, factories and at Nazi party events, and together reached an audience of twenty million per year. Together with Erbkrank and Alles Leben ist Kampf, Das Erbe reflects the spirit of the Nuremberg Laws by subordinating the people to the authority of a superior "breeder's" cost-benefit analysis.

See also
List of German films 1933–1945
Nazism and cinema
Aktion T4

Notes

Sources

References

Bibliography

, **cited in https://web.archive.org/web/20100131063204/http://www.mediaculture-online.de/fileadmin/bibliothek/zimmermann_propaganda/zimmermann_propaganda.html, retrieved 2010-02-21

hardback, Google books preview
pp. 505–529, 554–567 as cited by https://web.archive.org/web/20070927012529/http://www.mediaculture-online.de/fileadmin/bibliothek/zimmermann_propagandafilm/zimmermann_propagandafilm.html#sdfootnote22anc, retrieved: 2010-02-21

External links
 

1935 documentary films
1935 films
German short documentary films
Films of Nazi Germany
Nazi propaganda films
Films about euthanasia
German black-and-white films
1930s German films